The following is an overview of the events of 1892 in film, including a list of films released and notable births.

Events

 The final revisions to the Kinetoscope are made, including a vertical transport and wider film. This becomes the de facto technical specification for all silent film by 1909.
 Max Skladanowsky develops a camera and shoots his first footage this year, but its unusual interleaved image format leaves him ultimately unable to exhibit it until work is completed on the Bioskop projector in late 1895.
 October 18 – Théâtre Optique event opens, showing projected motion pictures to the public at the Musée Grévin in Paris.

Films released in 1892

Le Clown et ses chiens, a lost animated film directed by Charles-Émile Reynaud.
Pauvre Pierrot, an animated film directed by Charles-Émile Reynaud.
Un bon bock, a lost animated film directed by Charles-Émile Reynaud.
Le prince de Galles, a documentary short film about Edward, Prince of Wales directed by Louis Lumière.
Fencing, directed by William K. L. Dickson.
A Hand Shake, directed by William Heise and William K. L. Dickson.
Man on Parallel Bars, directed by William K. L. Dickson.
Wrestling, directed by William K. L. Dickson.
Boxing, made by Edison Manufacturing Company.

Births

External links

 1892  at the Internet Movie Database

 
Film by year
Articles containing video clips